NASA Astronaut Group 5 was a group of nineteen astronauts selected by NASA in April 1966. Of the six Lunar Module Pilots that walked on the Moon, three came from Group 5. The group as a whole is roughly split between the half who flew to the Moon (nine in all), and the half who flew Skylab and Space Shuttle, providing the core of Shuttle commanders early in that program. This group is also distinctive in being the only time when NASA hired a person into the astronaut corps who had already earned astronaut wings, X-15 pilot Joe Engle. John Young labeled the group the Original Nineteen in parody of the original Mercury Seven astronauts.

Background 
The launch of the Sputnik 1 satellite by the Soviet Union on October 4, 1957, started a Cold War technological and ideological competition with the United States known as the Space Race. The demonstration of American technological inferiority came as a profound shock to the American public. In response to the Sputnik crisis, although he did not see Sputnik as a grave threat, the President of the United States, Dwight D. Eisenhower, created a new civilian agency, the National Aeronautics and Space Administration (NASA), to oversee an American space program. Confidence that the United States was catching up with the Soviet Union was shattered on April 12, 1961, when the Soviet Union launched Vostok 1, and cosmonaut Yuri Gagarin became the first man to orbit the Earth. In response, Kennedy announced a far more ambitious goal on May 25, 1961: to put a man on the Moon by the end of the decade. This already had a name: Project Apollo.

By 1966, NASA was looking beyond Project Apollo. On February 3, 1966, the Chief of the Astronaut Office, Mercury Seven astronaut Alan Shepard, created a new branch office at the Manned Spacecraft Center (MSC) called the Advanced Programs Office. NASA announced plans for the future on March 3. The Apollo Applications Program (AAP), as it was named in September 1965, was extremely ambitious in scope. It called for no less than 45 crewed missions, utilizing 19 Saturn V and 26 Saturn IB rockets. There would be three orbital workshops, three orbital laboratories and four Apollo Telescope Mounts. The first AAP launch was expected to occur as early as April 1968 if the Moon landing went well. Each orbital laboratory was expected to be visited by two or three crews. At this point, NASA had 33 astronauts. The Director of Flight Crew Operations, Mercury Seven astronaut Deke Slayton, reckoned that NASA needed another two dozen trained astronauts for AAP. On September 10, 1965, NASA announced that it was recruiting more pilot astronauts.

Selection 
Key selection criteria were that candidates:
 Be a United States citizen;
 Born on or after December 1, 1929;
  or less in height;
 With a bachelor's degree in the physical or biological sciences, or engineering; and
 Either a graduate of an armed force test pilot school or with 1,000 hours of jet flying experience.
In addition, all applicants had to be able to pass a class I flight physical examination, which required 20–20 uncorrected vision. The height requirement was firm, an artifact of the size of the Apollo spacecraft. The criteria were much the same as those for NASA Astronaut Group 3 in 1963, except that the age requirement was raised from 34 to 36 years of age. Active-duty military applicants had to apply through their respective services. Civilian applicants and military reservists could apply directly. They had to fill in a Civil Service Form 57 Application for Federal Employment, which could be obtained from U.S. Post Offices, and mail it to Pilot-Astronaut, P.O. Box 2201, Houston, Texas. Applications had to be received postmarked by midnight December 1, 1965.

About 5,000 applications were received by the deadline. Of these, only 351 met the key criteria. From this group, 159 applicants, 100 of whom were military and 59 were civilians, were selected for further consideration. Six women had applied, but none apparently met the key criteria, most likely because women were not allowed to fly military jet aircraft in the United States at this time. Lieutenant Frank K. Ellis, a U.S. Navy aviator who had lost both legs in an air crash in July 1962, submitted an application, arguing that being a double amputee would not be a handicap in space. NASA was impressed with his tenacity, but he too was passed over. Michael Collins later recalled that while he felt a sense of relief at there being no female finalists, he was disturbed that there were no African-American ones.

From this 159, 44 were selected to undergo medical examinations at Brooks Air Force Base at San Antonio, Texas. These were conducted between January 7 and February 15, 1966. Several had been through the NASA astronaut selection process before. Edward Givens was applying for the second time, having previously applied for NASA Astronaut Group 1 in 1959. Jack Swigert was applying for the third time, having previously applied for NASA Astronaut Group 2 in 1962 and NASA Astronaut Group 3 in 1963. Vance Brand, Ron Evans, George Furlong, Jim Irwin and Don Lind had also applied in 1963, and Lind had applied for NASA Astronaut Group 4 as a scientist-astronaut in 1965, but had been rejected as too old. Psychological tests included Rorschach tests; physical tests included encephalograms, and sessions on treadmills and a centrifuge. Other tests included some that Lind thought had been originated by the Inquisition, such as plunging a hand into hot water and having cold water poured into the ears. 

The final stage of the selection process was an interview by the seven-member selection panel. This was chaired by Deke Slayton, with the other members being astronauts Alan Shepard, John Young, Michael Collins and C. C. Williams, NASA test pilot Warren North, and spacecraft designer Max Faget. Interviews were conducted over a week at the Rice Hotel. A point system that Slayton had devised for previous selections was used. Each candidate was given a score out of 30. Ten points were for "academics". This was broken down into one point for IQ, four for academic degrees and qualifications, three for NASA aptitude tests, and two for the results of a technical interview. Ten points were for "pilot performance", which were broken down into three points for flying record, a point for a test pilot rating, and six points for a technical interview. The remaining ten points were for "character and motivation". Thus, eighteen of the thirty points were awarded for the interview, which took about an hour for each of the candidates. The selection panel then met at Rice University to review their findings.

When the scores were tallied, Fred Haise came out with the highest score. In all, 19 candidates were rated as qualified. Young and Collins were shocked when Slayton said that he would take all 19. A reason for the larger-than-expected cohort was that the astronaut corps' attrition rate was double the 10% NASA had expected, including the deaths in February of Elliot M. See and Charles Bassett in the 1966 NASA T-38 crash. Selection occurred at the same time as for the second group of Manned Orbiting Laboratory (MOL) astronauts, with many applying to both programs. Successful candidates were told that NASA or MOL chose them, with no explanation.

Group members

Demographics 

John Young labeled the group the  "Original Nineteen" in parody of the original Mercury Seven astronauts. Of the nineteen, four were civilians: Brand, Haise, Lind and Swigert. Seven were from the USAF: Majors Givens, Irwin and Pogue, and Captains Duke, Engle, Roosa and Worden. Six were from the Navy: Lieutenant Commander Evans, Mitchell and Weitz, and Lieutenants Bull, Mattingly and McCandless. There were two marines, Major Carr and Captain Lousma. Swigert and Mattingly were single; all the rest were married with children. Carr had the most children, with six, followed by Lind with five, and Brand and Roosa, who had four. All were male and white. They were slightly older than the 1963 group, and this translated into more flying hours. Twelve were test pilots: Brand, Bull, Duke, Engle, Givens, Haise, Irwin, Mattingly, Mitchell, Pogue, Roosa and Worden. They also had more education than previous groups. Lind and Mitchell had doctorates, and Brand, Carr, Duke, Evans, Lousma, McCandless, Pogue, Swigert, Weitz and Worden had master's degrees. Engle had already earned his USAF astronaut wings flying the X-15, and Duke, Engle, Givens, Haise, Irwin, Mattingly, Mitchell, Roosa and Worden had received some astronaut training through the USAF Aerospace Research Pilot School (ARPS).

Training 
The selection of the nineteen was publicly announced on April 4, 1966. Seventeen of the nineteen faced the media for the first time at a press conference at the MSC News Center; Givens was still involved in USAF work, and Carr was recovering from a case of measles. On May 9, they commenced fifteen months of formal astronaut training. They were joined by Joseph Kerwin and Curt Michel from NASA Astronaut Group 4, who were qualified military pilots; the remaining three members of that group joined after they completed flight training in August. Together, the 24 new astronauts were the most that NASA had ever trained at the one time, although they would be surpassed by some of the later groups. The first order of business was checking out all the pilots on the aircraft that they would have to fly, the Lockheed T-33 and the Northrop T-38.

Training was conducted on Monday to Wednesday, with Thursday and Friday for field trips. They were given classroom instruction in astronomy (15 hours), aerodynamics (8 hours), rocket propulsion (8 hours), communications (10 hours), space medicine (17 hours), meteorology (4 hours), upper atmospheric physics (12 hours), navigation (34 hours), orbital mechanics (23 hours), computers (8 hours) and geology (112 hours).  The training in geology included field trips to the Grand Canyon and the Meteor Crater in Arizona, Philmont Scout Ranch in New Mexico, Horse Lava Tube System in Bend, Oregon, and the ash flow in the Marathon Uplift in Texas, and other locations, including Alaska and Hawaii. There was also jungle survival training in Panama, and desert survival training around Reno, Nevada. Water survival training was conducted at Naval Air Station Pensacola using the Dilbert Dunker. Some 30 hours of briefings were conducted on the Apollo command and service module, and twelve on the Apollo lunar module.

Operations 

Although training continued until September 1967, Shepard assigned them to six branches of his office on October 3, 1966. Engle, Lousma, Pogue and Weitz were assigned to the Apollo Applications Branch, which was headed by Group 3 member Alan Bean, with Bill Anders as his deputy. Brand, Evans, Mattingly, Swigert and Worden were assigned to the CSM Block II Branch, which was headed by Group 2 member Pete Conrad, with Group 3 member Richard Gordon as his deputy. Bull, Carr, Haise, Irwin and Mitchell were assigned to Group 2 member Neil Armstrong's LM/LLRV/LLRF Branch. Givens was assigned to John Young's Pressure Suits/PLSS Branch; Lind and McCandless were to Owen Garriott's Experiments Branch; and Duke and Roosa to Frank Borman and C.C. Williams's Boosters/Flight Safety Panels Branch.

In earlier groups, the senior astronaut had assumed the role of command module pilot while the more junior was the lunar module pilot, but the Nineteen were divided into CSM and LM specialists. Slayton asked each of the Nineteen which speciality he preferred, but made the final decision himself. This early division of assignments would have a profound effect on their subsequent careers. Brand, Evans, Givens, Mattingly, Pogue, Roosa, Swigert, Weitz and Worden became CSM specialists, while Bull, Carr, Duke, Engle, Haise, Irwin, Lind, Lousma, McCandless and Mitchell became LM specialists.

During Projects Mercury and Gemini, each mission had a prime and a backup crew. For Apollo, a third crew of astronauts was added, known as the support crew. The support crew maintained the flight plan, checklists, and mission ground rules, and ensured that the prime and backup crews were apprised of any changes. The support crew developed procedures in the simulators, especially those for emergency situations, so that the prime and backup crews could practice and master them in their simulator training.

Support crew assignments soon became the stepping stone to assignment to a backup, and then a prime crew. For the Apollo 1, which would not carry a LM, the support crew three CSM specialists were assigned to the support crew: Givens, Evans and Swigert. For Apollo 2, which would test the LM, two LM specialists, Haise and Mitchell, were assigned to the support crew, along with Worden, a CSM specialist. For Apollo 3, the support crew consisted of LM specialists Bull and Carr, and CSM specialist Mattingly. The schedule was disrupted by the deaths of Gus Grissom, Ed White and Roger Chaffee in the Apollo 1 fire on January 27, 1967, Givens in a car crash on June 6, and C.C. Williams in an air crash on October 5.  Pogue replaced Givens on the first support crew, which now supported Apollo 7.

Haise became the first of the Nineteen to be promoted to a backup crew assignment when he joined Armstrong's backup crew for the Apollo 9 mission, followed by Mitchell, who joined Gordon Cooper's backup crew for Apollo 10. They were replaced by Lousma and Roosa, respectively, while Brand replaced Bull, who had been forced to resign due to ill-health. Apollo 8 and 9 subsequently exchanged prime, backup and support crews, so Brand, Carr and Mattingly became the support crew of Apollo 8, and Lousma, Roosa and Worden became that of Apollo 9. Originally, Mitchell was in line to be the first member of the group to fly in space, but due to the swap of Apollo 13 and Apollo 14 crews, Swigert and Haise became the first. Starting with Apollo 13, each crew consisted of a senior astronaut from Group 1, 2 or 3, and a CM and LM specialist from the Nineteen, except that geologist Harrison Schmitt from Group 4 was designated as the lunar module pilot of Apollo 18, and then took Engle's place on Apollo 17 when Apollo 18 was canceled.

Of the 24 men who flew to the Moon on Apollo missions, nine were from the Nineteen, the most of any group. Three of them—Mitchell, Irwin and Duke—walked on the Moon, and Worden, Mattingly and Evans conducted deep space EVAs on the way back from the Moon. Four more of the Nineteen flew on the three Skylab missions, and also performed EVAs. Brand flew as command module pilot on the Apollo-Soyuz Test Project in July 1975, becoming the last of the Nineteen to fly in an Apollo spacecraft.

With no more space flights in prospect, ten of the Nineteen left NASA in the 1970s. The seven that remained would all fly Space Shuttle missions. Veteran astronauts Engle, Lousma, Mattingly, Brand and Weitz commanded STS-2, STS-3, STS-4, STS-5 and STS-6 respectively. McCandless was the only one of the Nineteen to perform an EVA from a shuttle, which he did as a mission specialist on his first space flight, the STS-41B mission in February 1984. Lind had to wait even longer; flying in space for the first time as a mission specialist on STS-51B in April and May 1985, nineteen years after he was first selected as an astronaut in April 1966, and fifteen after Haise and Swigert had become the first of the Nineteen to fly on Apollo 13 in April 1970. The last mission flown by any of the Nineteen was STS-35 in December 1990, which was commanded by Brand, who became the last member of the group to leave the Astronaut Office when he departed in 1992. Between them, the Nineteen had flown 29 Space Shuttle missions.

Notes

References 

 
 
 
 
 
 

 
  
 
 

NASA Astronaut Corps
Lists of astronauts
Charles Duke
Ronald Evans (astronaut)
Fred Haise
James Irwin
Ken Mattingly
Edgar Mitchell
Stuart Roosa
Jack Swigert
Alfred Worden